Undun is a 2011 existentialist concept album by the hip hop band The Roots.

Undun may also refer to:

Undun (song), a 1969 top 40 hit single by the Canadian band, The Guess Who, often mistakenly referred to as "She's Come Undone".
Lake Undun, lake on island of Roti, Indonesia

See also
Undone (disambiguation)